The Customs Administration, Ministry of Finance (CA) is the agency of the Ministry of Finance of Taiwan (ROC) dealing with customs policies and regulations in Taiwan. Republic of China is not a Member of World Customs Organization but ROC has signed reciprocal customs agreements with ten Customs authorities in the world as of 2022.

History
CA was originally established in 1854 as Inspectorate General of Customs. On 3 February 1991, it was renamed to Directorate General of Customs and finally on 1 January 2013, it was renamed to Customs Administration.

Organizational structure

Departments
 Department of Customs Clearance Affairs
 Department of Tariffs and Legal Affairs
 Department of Investigation
 Department of Information Management
 Department of Valuation and Auditing
 Department of Planning

Offices
 Secretariat
 Statistics Office
 Accounting Office
 Personnel Office
 Internal Affairs Office
 Civil Service Ethics Office

Transportation
The CA headquarter office is accessible within walking distance North West from Taipei Railway Station.

See also
 Ministry of Finance (Taiwan)

References

External links
 

2013 establishments in Taiwan
Executive Yuan
Government agencies established in 1854
Government of Taiwan
1854 establishments in China